746 Marlu (prov. designation:  or ) is a dark and large background asteroid from the outer regions of the asteroid belt, approximately  in diameter. It was discovered on 1 March 1913, by German astronomer Franz Kaiser at the Heidelberg Observatory in southwest Germany. The primitive P-type asteroid has a rotation period of 7.8 hours. It was named after the discoverer's daughter, Marie-Louise Kaiser.

Orbit and classification 

Marlu is a non-family asteroid of the main belt's background population when applying the hierarchical clustering method to its proper orbital elements. It orbits the Sun in the outer asteroid belt at a distance of 2.4–3.8 AU once every 5 years and 6 months (2,003 days; semi-major axis of 3.11 AU). Its orbit has an eccentricity of 0.24 and an inclination of 17° with respect to the ecliptic. The body's observation arc begins at Heidelberg on 12 September 1915, more than two years after its official discovery observation.

Naming 

Franz Kaiser named this minor planet after his daughter, the physician Marie-Louise Kaiser. The discoverer also named another asteroid, 743 Eugenisis, in honor of his daughter. The  was mentioned in The Names of the Minor Planets by Paul Herget in 1955.

Physical characteristics 

In the Tholen classification, Marlu is a dark and primitive P-type asteroid, while it is an X-type and P-type asteroid, in the Tholen- and SMASS-like taxonomic variant of the Small Solar System Objects Spectroscopic Survey (S3OS2), respectively. P-type asteroids are common in the outer asteroid belt and among the Jupiter trojan population. In the Moving Object Catalog (MOC) of the Sloan Digital Sky Survey, however, Marlu is a common carbonaceous C-type asteroid.

Rotation period and poles 

In September 1981, a rotational lightcurve of Marlu was obtained from photometric observations by American astronomer Alan W. Harris. Lightcurve analysis gave a rotation period of  hours with a brightness variation of  magnitude. In October 2014, Daniel A. Klinglesmith confirmed the exact same period of  hours with an amplitude of  magnitude.

In 2016, a modeled lightcurve gave a concurring sidereal period of  hours using data from a large collaboration of individual observers. The study also determined two spin axes of (202.0°, −66.0°) and (64.0°, −27.0°) in ecliptic coordinates (λ, β).

Diameter and albedo 

The Collaborative Asteroid Lightcurve Link adopts an albedo of 0.0431 and derives a diameter of 69.87 kilometers based on an absolute magnitude of 9.81. These timed observations are taken when the asteroid passes in front of a distant star.

References

External links 
 Lightcurve Database Query (LCDB), at www.minorplanet.info
 Dictionary of Minor Planet Names, Google books
 Discovery Circumstances: Numbered Minor Planets (1)-(5000) – Minor Planet Center
 
 

000746
Discoveries by Franz Kaiser
Named minor planets
000746
19130301